Leslie is a city in Ingham County in the U.S. state of Michigan. The population was 1,851 at the 2010 census. The city is surrounded by Leslie Township, but the two are administered autonomously.

Geography
The city of Leslie lies just east of US 127 in Ingham County on gently rolling hills. The city is located  directly south of Lansing, and  directly north of Jackson. Leslie is also near Meridian-Baseline State Park.

Numerous creeks flow through the city. Huntoon Creek, draining out from Huntoon Lake off of East Kinneville carves its way through downtown Leslie and by the City Little League Baseball fields.

History
Leslie was first settled by Elijah Woodworth in 1836, who built the first log cabin in the city. It was originally named Meekerville after a pioneer to the area, Benjamin Meeker. Jerry G. Cornell named the town after , his home state. The name Leslie was adopted officially when a post office was assigned to the area in 1841. Leslie was later incorporated as a village in 1869, and as a city nearly 100 years later in 1968.

Education
The Leslie Public School District is a small, rural district that educates nearly 1,400 students. The new Leslie High School was built in 1996 at 4141 Hull Road, and upgraded the middle school into the old high school building. The old middle school on Woodworth street (which was once a high school) was about 100 years old, and is now abandoned. The school district's mascot is the Leslie Blackhawk and the school colors are orange and black. Leslie's one public school has an average graduating class of between 100 and 130 students.

Also located in Leslie is White Pine Academy, a public school academy that is charted by Saginaw Valley State University White Pine Academy was founded in 1999 by a group of local parents looking for a back-to-basics curriculum and small class sizes. In 2005, White Pine Academy built a new facility at 510 Russell Street.

Sports

Varsity sports offered at Leslie include basketball, baseball, football, golf, tennis, cross country, track, soccer and wrestling for the boys and basketball, softball, cheerleading, golf, tennis, cross country, track, soccer and volleyball for the girls.

In 2008 the Leslie Blackhawks football team played for the Division VI state championship at Ford Field, but fell short to the Montague Wildcats, 41–20.

Distance running has been prominent in Leslie. An annual road race is held in mid-August during the annual Blackhawk Festival at the high school. It runs through the outskirts of the city and finishes on the track. Leslie High School's men's cross country running teams have won 14 consecutive conference championships (1990–2003) and one Class C state championship (1993).

Demographics

2010 census
As of the census of 2010, there were 1,851 people, 690 households, and 490 families residing in the city. The racial makeup of the city was 96.5% White, 0.9% African American, 0.3% Native American, 0.5% Asian, 0.2% from other races, and 1.5% from two or more races. Hispanic or Latino people of any race were 2.6% of the population.

There were 690 households, of which 38.1% had children under the age of 18 living with them, 50.3% were married couples living together, 13.5% had a female householder with no husband present, 7.2% had a male householder with no wife present, and 29.0% were non-families. 23.3% of all households were made up of individuals, and 7.7% had someone living alone who was 65 years of age or older. The average household size was 2.64 and the average family size was 3.08.

The median age in the city was 35.7 years. 28.5% of residents were under the age of 18; 7% were between the ages of 18 and 24; 28.8% were from 25 to 44; 26.1% were from 45 to 64; and 9.7% were 65 years of age or older. The gender makeup of the city was 49.3% male and 50.7% female.

2000 census
As of the census of 2000, there were 2,044 people, 734 households, and 518 families residing in the city. The racial makeup of the city was 96.04% White, 0.39% African American, 0.29% Native American, 0.68% Asian, 0.05% Pacific Islander, 0.98% from other races, and 1.57% from two or more races. Hispanic or Latino people of any race were 3.38% of the population.

There were 734 households, out of which 39.8% had children under the age of 18 living with them, 52.3% were married couples living together, 12.9% had a female householder with no husband present, and 29.4% were non-families. 24.5% of all households were made up of individuals, and 9.8% had someone living alone who was 65 years of age or older. The average household size was 2.76 and the average family size was 3.31.

In the city, the population was spread out, with 31.4% under the age of 18, 9.1% from 18 to 24, 31.4% from 25 to 44, 19.4% from 45 to 64, and 8.6% who were 65 years of age or older. The median age was 32 years. For every 100 females, there were 94.1 males. For every 100 females age 18 and over, there were 93.4 males.

The median income for a household in the city was $42,700, and the median income for a family was $48,162. Males had a median income of $36,771 versus $22,600 for females. The per capita income for the city was $18,124. About 4.9% of families and 7.5% of the population were below the poverty line, including 8.7% of those under age 18 and 4.9% of those age 65 or over.

Notable residents
 Voltairine de Cleyre, anarchist, writer, and feminist; born in Leslie
 Holling Clancy Holling, children's author and illustrator of Paddle to the Sea and Pagoo; graduated from Leslie High School in 1917
 Arthur J. Tuttle, former U.S. District Judge; born in Leslie
 Frank L. White, believed to be the model for the chef on Cream of Wheat boxes; buried in Leslie at Woodlawn Cemetery

References

External links
 Official website of the City of Leslie

Cities in Ingham County, Michigan
Lansing–East Lansing metropolitan area
Populated places established in 1836
1836 establishments in Michigan Territory